3391 Sinon  is a mid-sized Jupiter trojan from the Greek camp, approximately  in diameter. It was discovered on 18 February 1977, by Japanese astronomers Hiroki Kosai and Kiichirō Furukawa at the Kiso Observatory in Japan. The dark Jovian asteroid has a rotation period of 8.1 hours and likely an elongated shape. It was named after the hero Sinon from Greek mythology.

Orbit and classification 

Sinon is a dark Jovian asteroid in a 1:1 orbital resonance with Jupiter. It is located in the leading Greek camp at the Gas Giant's  Lagrangian point, 60° ahead on its orbit . It is also a non-family asteroid of the Jovian background population. It orbits the Sun at a distance of 4.9–5.7 AU once every 12 years and 3 months (4,461 days; semi-major axis of 5.3 AU). Its orbit has an eccentricity of 0.08 and an inclination of 15° with respect to the ecliptic. The body's observation arc begins with a precovery at Palomar Observatory in March 1953, almost 24 years prior to its official discovery observation at Kiso.

Physical characteristics 

Sinon is an assumed, carbonaceous C-type asteroid.

Rotation period 

In February 2013, a rotational lightcurve of Sinon was obtained from photometric observations by Lawrence Wasserman at Lowell Observatory and by Robert Stephens at the Center for Solar System Studies. Lightcurve analysis gave a well-defined rotation period of  hours with a brightness amplitude of 0.72 magnitude, indicative of a non-spherical shape.

Diameter and albedo 

According to the survey carried out by the NEOWISE mission of NASA's Wide-field Infrared Survey Explorer, Sinon measures 37.86 kilometers in diameter and its surface has an albedo of 0.093, while the Collaborative Asteroid Lightcurve Link assumes a standard albedo for a carbonaceous asteroid of 0.057 and calculates a diameter of 48.48 kilometers based on an absolute magnitude of 10.3.

Naming 

This minor planet was named from Greek mythology after Sinon, a Greek warrior of the Trojan War. The official naming citation was published by the Minor Planet Center on 16 December 1986.

Notes

References

External links 
 Asteroid Lightcurve Database (LCDB), query form (info )
 Dictionary of Minor Planet Names, Google books
 Discovery Circumstances: Numbered Minor Planets (1)-(5000) – Minor Planet Center
 Asteroid 3391 Sinon at the Small Bodies Data Ferret
 
 

003391
Discoveries by Hiroki Kosai
Discoveries by Kiichirō Furukawa
Named minor planets
19770218